Henry Curran (25 January 1912 – 21 October 1975) was an Australian politician who was a Labor Party member of the Legislative Assembly of Western Australia from 1960 to 1968.

Curran was born in Stirling, Scotland, to Rosina (née McKenna) and Patrick Curran. He and his parents emigrated to Australia when he was a child. After leaving school, Curran worked for various companies in the Fremantle area, and became involved in the union movement. He also served in the Australian Army during World War II, as a transport driver. Curran entered parliament at the 1960 by-election for the seat of South Fremantle, which had been caused by the death of Dick Lawrence. His seat was abolished at the 1962 state election, and he successfully transferred to the new seat of Cockburn. In 1963, Curran was involved in a traffic accident that resulted in the amputation of a leg. He was re-elected unopposed at the 1965 election, and retired at the 1968 election. Curran died in Perth in 1975, aged 63. He had married Alma Bindley in 1936, with whom he had two children.

References

1912 births
1975 deaths
Australian Army soldiers
Australian Labor Party members of the Parliament of Western Australia
Australian Army personnel of World War II
Trade unionists from Western Australia
Members of the Western Australian Legislative Assembly
People from Stirling
Scottish emigrants to Australia
Australian amputees
Australian politicians with disabilities
20th-century Australian politicians